João Franco do Vale (born 13 July 1930, date of death unknown) was a Portuguese water polo player. He competed in the men's tournament at the 1952 Summer Olympics.

References

External links
 

1930 births
Year of death missing
Portuguese male water polo players
Olympic water polo players of Portugal
Water polo players at the 1952 Summer Olympics
Sportspeople from Lisbon